Cruella is a 2021 American crime comedy film based on the character Cruella de Vil from Dodie Smith's 1956 novel The Hundred and One Dalmatians. The film was directed by Craig Gillespie with a screenplay by Dana Fox and Tony McNamara, from a story by Aline Brosh McKenna, Kelly Marcel, and Steve Zissis. It is the third live-action adaptation in the 101 Dalmatians franchise, and serves as a reboot and an alternate origin story for the title character. Emma Stone stars as the title character, with Emma Thompson, Joel Fry, Paul Walter Hauser, Emily Beecham, Kirby Howell-Baptiste, and Mark Strong in supporting roles. Set in London during the punk rock movement of the 1970s, the film revolves around Estella Miller, an aspiring fashion designer, as she explores the path that leads her to become a notorious up-and-coming fashion designer known as Cruella de Vil.

In 2013, Walt Disney Pictures announced the film's development with Andrew Gunn as a producer. Stone was cast in 2016 and also serves as an executive producer on the film alongside Glenn Close, who portrayed Cruella in the previous live-action adaptations, 101 Dalmatians (1996) and 102 Dalmatians (2000). Principal photography took place in England between August and November 2019.

Cruella premiered in Los Angeles on May 18, 2021, in the first major red carpet event since the COVID-19 pandemic began, and was released in the United States theatrically and simultaneously available on Disney+ with its Premier Access feature on May 28. The film received generally positive reviews, with critics praising the performances of the cast (particularly those of Stone, Thompson, and Hauser), Gillespie's direction, visual style, costume design, production values, and soundtrack, with criticism aimed at its screenplay. It grossed over $233 million worldwide. The film earned two nominations at the 94th Academy Awards, including Best Makeup and Hairstyling, winning Best Costume Design. It was also nominated in the former category and won in the latter at the 27th Critics' Choice Awards and 75th British Academy Film Awards while Stone was nominated for Best Actress in a Motion Picture – Comedy or Musical at the 79th Golden Globe Awards. A sequel is in development, with Stone set to reprise her titular role.

Plot
In 1964 England, Estella is a creative child with a talent for fashion, but is ostracized for her black and white hair and develops a nefarious streak. Her mother, Catherine, decides to move them to London, stopping at a party at a mysterious mansion called Hellman Hall on the Suffolk coast to ask the host for money. Sneaking inside, Estella loses her mother’s necklace while being chased by the host's ferocious Dalmatian dogs, which push Catherine off a cliffside balcony to her death. Orphaned, Estella runs away to London and befriends street urchins Jasper and Horace.

Ten years later in 1974, Estella practices thievery and grifts with Jasper and Horace, honing her fashion skills by designing their disguises, alongside their dogs, Buddy and Wink. For her birthday in 1977, Jasper and Horace get her a job at the Liberty department store, but Estella is made a janitor and denied the chance to use her talents. She drunkenly redecorates the window  display and impresses the Baroness—a renowned but authoritarian haute couture designer—who offers her a coveted job at her fashion house. Estella gains the Baroness's confidence but notices her wearing Catherine’s necklace, which the Baroness claims is a family heirloom that an employee once stole. Estella asks Jasper and Horace to help retrieve the necklace during the Baroness's Black and White Ball.

To conceal her identity, Estella creates an alter-ego, "Cruella", and wears one of the Baroness's old designs from a vintage clothing store owned by the flamboyant Artie. At the ball, Cruella steals the spotlight as Jasper and Horace break into the Baroness's vault, but she is already wearing the necklace. Jasper releases rats into the party, allowing Estella to swipe the necklace. The Baroness summons her Dalmatians with a dog whistle, and Estella realizes the Baroness caused Catherine's death. In the ensuing chaos, one of the Dalmatians swallows the necklace. Seeking revenge, Estella orders Jasper and Horace to kidnap the Dalmatians, and recovers the necklace. Cruella upstages the Baroness at various events in extravagant fashions, gaining notoriety via society columnist Anita Darling, Estella’s childhood friend. Furious, the Baroness fires her lawyer, Roger Dearly, while Cruella's increasingly haughty behavior discomforts Jasper.

Estella designs and sews an elaborately beaded dress as the signature piece for the Baroness's spring collection and stages a robbery in the fashion house, leading the Baroness to lock up all the dresses. The night of the spring show, the Baroness opens the vault to find that the entire collection has been destroyed by thousands of moths, having emerged from the beads on the dress which were actually moth cocoons. Seeing what she has done, the Baroness realizes Estella and Cruella are the same person. Having wrecked the Baroness' show, Cruella stages her own fashion show outside in Regent's Park, wearing a faux Dalmatian-fur coat. Returning home, Estella is confronted by the Baroness and her men, who have captured Jasper and Horace. Setting fire to the building, the Baroness leaves Estella to die, and has Jasper and Horace sent to prison for her murder. Estella is saved by John, the Baroness's valet, who reveals that the necklace unlocks a box containing Estella’s birth records: the Baroness is her biological mother. She had ordered John to murder the infant Estella to focus on her career and keep her late husband's inheritance. Instead, John gave the baby to Catherine, one of the Baroness's maids, who raised Estella in secret.

Cruella breaks Jasper and Horace out of prison and reveals the truth, recruiting them, Artie, and John for her final scheme. The quintet sneaks into the Baroness's charity gala, having arranged for all the guests to dress as Cruella. Estella confronts her mother on the balcony, and the Baroness feigns an embrace before pushing her over the cliff, unwittingly witnessed by her guests. Estella secretly survives with a hidden parachute and, now legally dead, adopts her Cruella persona for good. The Baroness is arrested, swearing revenge on Cruella. Before her "death", Estella willed her inheritance to Cruella, including the manor which she renames from Hellman Hall to "Hell Hall", moving in with her accomplices. 

In a mid-credits scene, Anita and Roger each receive a Dalmatian puppy from Cruella.

Cast

 Emma Stone as Estella / Cruella: An ambitious grifter and aspiring fashion designer, who goes on to become a notorious and dangerous criminal.
 Billie Gadsdon as five-year-old Estella
 Tipper Seifert-Cleveland as twelve-year-old Estella
 Emma Thompson as the Baroness: The narcissistic, authoritarian, and egotistical head of a prestigious London fashion house and a renowned haute couture designer, who is Estella's new boss and eventual rival. She plays a key role in Estella's transformation and is later revealed to be Estella's biological mother.
 Joel Fry as Jasper: A thief who grew up with Estella after her adoptive mother's death. To play Jasper, Fry did not look back at the character's depiction in the original animated film or the 1996 live-action remake, only copying his physical mannerisms.
 Ziggy Gardner as young Jasper
 Paul Walter Hauser as Horace: A thief who grew up with Estella after her adoptive mother's death and Jasper's brother. Hauser drew inspiration for the role from the performance of Bob Hoskins as Mr. Smee in Hook.
 Joseph MacDonald as young Horace
 Emily Beecham as Catherine: Estella's adoptive mother, an impoverished laundrywoman and former maid at Hellman Hall.
 Kirby Howell-Baptiste as Anita Darling: Estella's childhood classmate, who works as a gossip columnist. Anita is later gifted a female Dalmatian puppy named Perdita by Cruella.
 Florisa Kamara as young Anita
 Mark Strong as John: The Baroness's valet and loyal confidante who aids her in her schemes. He later saves Cruella's life in a warehouse fire and helps her get a piece of revenge.

John McCrea portrays Artie, a member of Cruella's entourage and owner of a vintage fashion shop. He was the first original character in a live-action Disney film to be openly gay and the character is inspired by David Bowie's Ziggy Stardust and Marc Bolan. Additionally, Kayvan Novak portrays Roger Dearly, a lawyer working for the Baroness, who becomes a songwriter after he is fired, and is subsequently gifted a male Dalmatian puppy named Pongo by Cruella; Jamie Demetriou portrays Gerald, a clerk at Liberty who is Estella's initial boss; Andrew Leung portrays Jeffrey, the Baroness's assistant; Leo Bill portrays the headmaster at Estella's school; Paul Bazely portrays the police commissioner Weston; Ed Birch portrays the Baroness's head of security; Paul Chowdhry portrays a Kebab Shop Owner, while Abraham Popoola portrays his co-worker George; and Tom Turner appears as the Baron von Hellman, the Baroness's late husband and Cruella's biological father.

Production

Development and casting

A live-action Cruella de Vil film, based upon the character in Disney's 101 Dalmatians franchise, was announced in 2013. Andrew Gunn was hired to produce the film, with Glenn Close (who previously played the character in the 1996 live-action adaptation 101 Dalmatians and its sequel 102 Dalmatians) serving as executive producer and Kelly Marcel revising the script originally written by Aline Brosh McKenna. In January 2016, Emma Stone was cast in the titular role of Cruella de Vil. Costume designer Jenny Beavan later stated that her role on the film was to help Stone appear as a younger 1970s portrayal of Close's 1990s role in 101 Dalmatians, possibly confirming the shared continuity between the films, though the characters of Roger and Anita appear as the same age as Cruella and portrayed as different races with different occupations in this film. However, Stone was not allowed to portray Cruella smoking as she had previously been since Disney had banned characters being shown smoking in its films since 2007.

In August 2016, Jez Butterworth was hired to rewrite the previous draft of the screenplay. In November 2016, it was reported that Disney had hired Alex Timbers to direct the live-action adaptation, with Marc Platt joining the film as a producer. However, in December 2018, it was revealed that Timbers had left the film due to scheduling conflicts and Craig Gillespie would instead direct the film. In May 2019, Emma Thompson joined the cast as the Baroness, described as "an antagonist to Cruella who's thought to be pivotal in her transformation to the villain we know today.” Nicole Kidman was considered to be the top choice, and Charlize Theron, Julianne Moore and Demi Moore were also in consideration for the role, while Dev Patel was considered for the role of Roger Dearly.  The same month, Tony McNamara and Dana Fox were hired to write the recent version of the screenplay. Joel Fry and Paul Walter Hauser were added in the following months as Jasper and Horace.

Filming
In August 2019, during the D23 Expo, it was revealed that principal photography for Cruella had already begun. In September 2019, Mark Strong, Emily Beecham and Kirby Howell-Baptiste were added to the cast. Filming wrapped in November 2019.

Music and soundtrack

On March 31, 2021, it was announced that Nicholas Britell was hired to compose the film's score. The score album was released on May 21, 2021, by Walt Disney Records.

A separate soundtrack album for the film was released on the same day. Both albums feature "Call Me Cruella", an original song performed by Florence and the Machine, which appears in the end credits of the film.

Release

Theatrical and streaming
Cruella was originally scheduled to be theatrically released on December 23, 2020, but it was delayed to May 28, 2021. The film received a PG-13 rating from the Motion Picture Association, "for some violence and thematic elements," making it the second live-action remake/spin-off of a Disney animated film to receive the rating, following Mulan. On March 23, 2021, it was announced that the film would be released simultaneously on Disney+ with Premier Access in response to the COVID-19 pandemic. The film premiered at the El Capitan Theatre in Los Angeles on May 18, 2021, the first major red carpet premiere since the pandemic began.

Tickets for the theatrical screenings went on sale on May 14, 2021, and it was announced that the film would also be screened in Dolby Cinema in select territories. It was first screened for critics the same day.

Marketing
A prequel novel titled Cruella: Hello, Cruel Heart was published by Disney Publishing Worldwide on April 6, 2021. Written by Maureen Johnson, the novel is set before the events of the movie, in 1967. It followed sixteen-year-old Estella and her encounter with Magda and Richard Moresby-Plum, two wealthy siblings who introduced her to the world of the rich and famous. 
A tie-in novelization of the film by Elizabeth Rudnick was published by Disney on April 13, 2021. A book titled Cruella's Sketchbook was also released on the same day. 
A manga adaptation of the movie by Hachi Ishie, titled Cruella: Black, White and Red was released by Viz Media on August 17, 2021.

On May 28, 2021, MAC Cosmetics launched a make-up collection inspired by the film.

On May 28, 2021, Disney+, in partnership with Social Tailors and Jeferson Araujo released an AR Effect for Cruella, where users could share stories on Instagram of themselves with makeup and visuals inspired by the new movie of the Disney character.

Home media
Cruella was released by Walt Disney Studios Home Entertainment on Digital on June 25, 2021, and Ultra HD Blu-ray, Blu-ray and DVD on September 21, 2021. In the United Kingdom and Australia, the film was released on home video on August 16 and 18, respectively.

On August 27, the film was made available for streaming to all customers on Disney+.

Reception

PVOD viewership
According to Samba TV, the film was watched by about 686,000 American households in its debut weekend (39% behind Mulans 1.12 million), resulting in around $20.57 million in revenue for Disney. The company also reported 83,000 UK households watched the film (resulting in $2.35 million), 15,000 in Germany, and 9,000 in Australia. In its first 30 days, the film was watched in an estimated 1.8 million U.S. households, generating a total of $54 million. In January 2022, tech firm Akamai reported that Cruella was the seventh most pirated film of 2021.

Box office
, Cruella has grossed $86.1 million in the United States and Canada, and $147.4 million in other territories, for a worldwide total of $233.5 million.

In the United States and Canada, Cruella was released alongside A Quiet Place Part II, and was projected to gross $17–23 million from 3,892 theaters in its opening weekend, and around $30 million over the four-day Memorial Day frame. The film made $7.7 million in its first day, including $1.4 million from Thursday night previews. It went on to debut to $21.5 million and a total of $26.5 million over the four days, finishing second at the box office. 61% of the tracked audience was female, with 43% being under 25 years old. In its sophomore weekend the film grossed $11 million, finishing third behind The Conjuring: The Devil Made Me Do It and A Quiet Place Part II. The film then fell to 5th place in its third weekend, grossing $6.7 million. Deadline Hollywood wrote that despite having a running total of $71 million through five weeks, sources believed that the "Disney+ Premier PVOD tier is impacting the pic's overall revenue, not just at the box office, but in the movie's downstream ancillary revenues."

The film made $26.5 million in its domestic opening and earned $16.1 million in 29 other countries, for a global debut of $43 million. In China, Cruella debuted with a less-than-expected $1.7 million opening, finishing behind holdover F9 which earned $8.9 million.

Critical response

On the review aggregator Rotten Tomatoes, 75% of 408 critics have given the film a positive review, with an average rating of 6.8/10. The website's critics consensus reads: "Cruella can't quite answer the question of why its title character needed an origin story, but this dazzling visual feast is awfully fun to watch whenever its leading ladies lock horns." On Metacritic, the film has a weighted average score of 59 out of 100 based on 56 critic reviews, indicating "mixed or average reviews". Audiences polled by CinemaScore gave the film an average grade of "A" on an A+ to F scale, while PostTrak reported 84% of audience members gave it a positive score, with 63% saying they would definitely recommend it.

Writing for Variety, Peter Debruge said: "The director, who brought a wicked edge to pop-culture redux I, Tonya a few years back, has rescued Cruella from the predictability of the earlier 101 Dalmatians remakes and created a stylish new franchise of its own in which a one-time villain has been reborn as the unlikeliest of role models." A. O. Scott of The New York Times called the film "easy enough to watch but hard to care much about," complimenting the film's visual style while also finding that "[the film's] main purpose is to remind you that other movies exist." Peter Travers, reviewing the film for ABC News, wrote: "If looks really were everything, Cruella would be flying high on the dazzling costumes that two-time Oscar winner Jenny Beavan has designed for and with two Oscar-winning Emmas–Stone and Thompson–are dressed to wow and deliver much to enjoy in this beautifully crafted fluffball and hits its stride when the two Emmas go on the diva warpath—all in the name of female empowerment." Justin Chang of Los Angeles Times remarked the movie as "dazzling fun" and lauded the performances of Stone and Thompson, of which he described the rivalry of the performances as "hard to resist on-screen", and hailed Beavan's costume design on the film as one of her best works since Mad Max: Fury Road, while drawing parallels of the film's moral ambiguities and Stone's portrayal of the titular character to her previous performance as Abigail Hill in The Favourite.

Alonso Duralde of TheWrap wrote: "Placing these characters in the '60s and '70s allows director Craig Gillespie and screenwriters Dana Fox and Tony McNamara to place the characters into an exciting moment of fashion history... Costumer Jenny Beavan, art director Martin Foley, and production designer Fiona Crombie, and their respective departments, all seem to be enjoying and making the most of the film's period demands." In addition, Duralde also lauded the performances of Stone, Hauser, and Thompson, drawing comparisons of the characterizations of the latter's portrayal of the Baroness to Miranda Priestly in The Devil Wears Prada and Reynolds Woodcock in Phantom Thread. Peter Bradshaw of The Guardian awarded the film four out of five stars, describing it as "entertaining" and an "outrageous punk", as well as praising the performances and dynamic between Stone and Thompson. Furthermore, Bradshaw also complimented the tone of the film's soundtrack to Michael Jackson and similarly praised the film's mid-70s costume and production designs of Beavan and Crombie as "top-notch". Chicago Sun-Timess Richard Roeper rated the film with 3/4 stars, and highlighted Gillespie's direction for being "clever" and "devilishly offbeat" while praising the performances of Stone and Thompson as "appropriately over-the-top and wildly entertaining", drawing its comparisons to The Devil Wears Prada and also commended the costumes, makeup, and the production values of which he referred to as "spectacular", "dazzling" and a "visual feast", comparing its style to Phantom Thread and noting the similarities of the vibe and tone of the film's soundtrack to Goodfellas, Kingsman: The Secret Service, and Baby Driver.

The Daily Telegraph's Robbie Collin scored the film four out of five, similarly praised the film, which he described as a "rollicking tale" and an "acid-tipped wackiness", and lauded the film for its different approach in the Disney live-action adaptations as well as the previous 101 Dalmatians versions and its interpretation of the central character in a new context. He also similarly praised the performances (particularly Stone and Thompson) as well as the supporting cast, which he referred to as "zany", while specifically remarking of Stone's performance of Cruella De Vil as "sharp-angled, hyper-expressive" and that Thompson's portrayal of the Baroness "stalks the fine line between threatening and ludicrous with stiletto-heel precision". In addition, Collin also praised the film's visual style and Beavan's costume design as "eyeball-popping" and "a garden-hose-blast to the eyeballs of pure sartorial flair and exuberance". K. Austin Collins of Rolling Stone  rated the film with three out of five stars, praising Stone's success in embodying the titular character, and describing her performance as "vampy, stylish, and cruel" while comparing the film's style of storytelling to I, Tonya, of which he noted a similar internalized  victim-like story perspective of Tonya Harding to Cruella de Vil and even pointed out on the similar "plausibly two-sided" depiction of Stone's Cruella to Andrea "Andy" Sachs from The Devil Wears Prada, but with a twisted spin. He also commended the supporting performances, particularly Thompson and Hauser, referring the film as "a battle of wits and knits", "entertaining", and "fun". Jamie Jirak from ComicBook.com called the film as "raising the bar when it comes to their [Disney's] live-action catalog", praising the art department, the performances and nostalgic elements. Debopriyaa Dutta from Screen Rant opined that the film told a "masterfully nuanced origin" and praised the performances of Stone and Hauser. The Hollywood Outsider'''s Morgan Lanier described the film as “taking place in the 70’s with a lot of camp to lighten the mood”, praising Stone for giving Cruella  “a twist of vulnerability” and giving the longstanding Disney villain a “fun glimmer”. Lanier also praised Thompson’s performance saying “Thompson gives the baroness the ability to chill a room”. Lanier concluded that the movie was “joyous, campy, great costumes, […] amplified by a killer soundtrack”. Kate Erbland of IndieWire gave the film a "B−", and labelling the film as "exciting" and "fun" and a "colorful, loud, and unexpected look" on the origin story of Cruella De Vil while Erbland singled out the praises on the casting and the performances of Stone, Thompson, Fry, Hauser, and the costumes, but found fault at the film's runtime of which she referred it as "bloated".The Washington Posts Ann Hornaday described the film as "tedious, transgressive, chaotic and inert". While praising the performances of Stone, Thompson, Fry, and Hauser, as well as the costumes; she criticized the film, writing, and the runtime of which she found it as "overstuffed", "overlong", and "miserably misanthropic". Mick LaSalle of the San Francisco Chronicle thought the film was misbegotten and felt that it favors more on style over substance. Though he praised Thompson's performance, the costume design and the soundtrack, he chided the film's writing as "lazy" and "careless". Matt Zoller Seitz of RogerEbert.com gave the film 2/4 stars, and said: "There's no denying that Cruella is stylish and kinetic, with a nasty edge that's unusual for a recent Disney live-action feature. But it's also exhausting, disorganized, and frustratingly inert, considering how hard it works to assure you that it's thrilling and cheeky." Jacobins Eileen Jones labelled the film as a "dopey, uninspired, and tedious mess", specifically criticizing the script as "basically rotten" and describing the transformation of Cruella's character as "the complete mangling of one of the greatest Disney villains of all time." Jones took issue with the absence of the "implied critique [...] of Cruella's wealthy entitlement and mad consumer obsession" as shown in 101 Dalmatians, and the attempt to make a "legendary dalmatian-skinning villain" into a "scrappy, likable hero." Jones complimented the film's costume design, specifically emphasizing the "trash gown" shown at the Baroness fashion show, and describing it as "sufficiently cool that costume designer Jenny Beavan may win another Oscar."

 Accolades 

Sequel
In May 2021, both Stone and Thompson stated that they would like to do a second Cruella film as both a sequel and prequel in the style of The Godfather Part II''. In June 2021, Disney announced that a sequel is officially in the early stages of development, with Gillespie and McNamara expected to return as director and writer, respectively. In August 2021, Stone closed a deal to reprise her role in the sequel.

References

External links
 
 
 

101 Dalmatians films
2021 films
2021 comedy films
2021 crime films
2021 LGBT-related films
2020s American films
2020s crime comedy films
2020s English-language films
American crime comedy films
American films about revenge
American LGBT-related films
Cross-dressing in American films
Films about dogs
Films about fashion designers
Films about fashion in the United Kingdom
Films about orphans
Films based on adaptations
Films based on multiple works
Films directed by Craig Gillespie
Films impacted by the COVID-19 pandemic
Films produced by Marc E. Platt
Films scored by Nicholas Britell
Films set in London
Films set in the 1960s
Films set in the 1970s
Films shot at Shepperton Studios
Films that won the Best Costume Design Academy Award
Films with Disney+ Premier Access
Films with screenplays by Aline Brosh McKenna
Films with screenplays by Kelly Marcel
Live-action films based on Disney's animated films
Punk films
Reboot films
Walt Disney Pictures films